The 1979–80 Coupe de France was the 63rd Coupe de France, France's annual national football cup competition. It was won by AS Monaco, who defeated US Orléans in the final.

Round of 16

Quarter-finals

Semi-finals
First round

Second round

Final

References

French federation

1979–80 domestic association football cups
1979–80 in French football
1979-80